Oxalis valdiviensis, the Chilean yellow-sorrel,  is an Oxalis species found in Chile and Argentina.

References

External links

valdiviensis